Athlone Power Station was a coal-fired power station in Athlone, Cape Town, South Africa. The site stopped generating power in 2003 and is in the process of being decommissioned.

Athlone Power Station was situated on the N2 freeway into the city, consisted of a large brick generation building, two 99m brick chimneys, and two cooling towers, fed by reclaimed water from a nearby sewage plant.  It was commissioned in 1962 with 6 turbines with a nominal capacity of 180 megawatts, and operated by the City of Cape Town. Between 1985 and 1994 the station was held on standby, but it resumed generating in 1995 with a reduced capacity of 120 MW. Between 1995 and 2003 it was mainly used to generate power in peak demand periods and during power failures of the national grid. In 2003, significant investment was required due to the age of the power station, and generation was stopped.

Decommissioning

Athlone was the last coal-fired power station operating in Cape Town; the others, in the city centre and Salt River, were demolished in the 1980s and 1990s. The cost of transport means that coal costs three to five times more in Cape Town than it does near the mines inland, making it more economical to transmit power from there to Cape Town than to generate power in Cape Town from transported coal.

The lifespan of the station's two cooling towers had been extended in 1993 through the addition of reinforcing bands, but on 14 February 2010, the bands on one tower collapsed, leading the city to announce that the towers would be demolished by the end of April 2010 to prevent their collapse; the demolition was postponed to 22 August 2010 when they were finally demolished.

The power station building and two 99m high chimneys are still standing while the city decides on the future of the site.

See also

 List of power stations in South Africa

References

Coal-fired power stations in South Africa
Buildings and structures in Cape Town
Former power stations in South Africa
Former coal-fired power stations
1962 establishments in South Africa
2003 disestablishments in South Africa
Energy infrastructure completed in 1962
Economy of Cape Town
Athlone, Cape Town
20th-century architecture in South Africa